The Extraordinary Adventures of Baron Munchausen is a tabletop role-playing game, written by James Wallis, and published by Hogshead Publishing in 1998.

Description
The Extraordinary Adventures of Baron Munchausen is a multi-player storytelling/tabletop role-playing game. It is based on the stories about Baron Munchausen.

Publication history
The Extraordinary Adventures of Baron Munchausen was published by Hogshead Publishing in 1998.

James Wallis was able to publish his game The Extraordinary Adventures of Baron Munchausen in 1998, the first of what would later be called the company's "New Style" RPGs.

In 2008, a 2nd edition was published by Magnum Opus Press. The first 1000 copies, called Gentleman's Edition, came out in a hardback deluxe format with a black leather effect cover with gold embossing, the rest of the print was published in softcover and was called the Wives' and Servants' Edition. A third, digital version, called the Difference Engine Number 3 Edition was available exclusively from E23, the digital store of Steve Jackson Games, and DriveThruRPG. All three editions are the same, except for one illustration which is only present in the Gentleman's Edition. The Wives' and Servants' Edition was reprinted in 2013.

In 2016, Fantasy Flight Games released a new, third edition of the book in full color and with all-new artwork.

Reception
The reviewer from the online second volume of Pyramid stated that "I should tell you up front that this role-playing game sort of isn't. I mean, you're playing a role, all right. At least one, that of a gentleman [...] of the eighteenth century telling tall stories to his peers, among whom is (in spirit if not flesh) the Baron Munchausen. In the course of that story, you may find yourself playing yet another role, one that a too-stringent regard for the letter of the truth oft miscalled "Gospel" might prevent you from playing with quite the verve and elan that the potent spirits coursing through your veins demand. In short, you win drinks by lying well. You can already tell why writers love this game."

Reviews
Shadis #52 (Oct., 1998)
SF Site
Pyramid

References

External links
 The Extraordinary Adventures of Baron Munchausen at rpggeek

British role-playing games
Hogshead Publishing games
Role-playing games based on novels
Role-playing games introduced in 1998